Butch Jamie is a gender-bending romantic comedy film that premiered in July 2007 at Outfest: the Los Angeles Gay and Lesbian Film Festival. Writer, director, and lead actress Michelle Ehlen won Outfest's Grand Jury Award for "Outstanding Actress in a Feature Film." The film was produced independently through the filmmaker's production company, Ballet Diesel Films.

Plot
The film follows the story of Jamie, a struggling butch lesbian actress who gets cast as a man in a film. The main plot is a romantic comedy between Jamie's male alter-ego, "Male Jamie," and Jill, a heterosexual woman on set. The film's subplots include Jamie's bisexual roommate Lola and her cat actor Howard, Lola's abrasive butch German girlfriend Andi, and Jamie's gay Asian friend David.

Cast
 Michelle Ehlen as Jamie
 Olivia Nix as Lola
 Tiffany Anne Carrin as Jill
 David Au as David
 Andrea Andrei as Andi
 Joe McDaniel as Dan
 Mary Lynch as Francine
 Nathan Edmondson as Glen

Comedic elements
Butch Jamie utilizes deadpan humor through slapstick, irony, and satire. The film incorporates elements of slapstick physical comedy along with the irony of Jamie entering into a "heterosexual" relationship with an unknowing woman. As a satire, the film pokes fun at gender roles, social assumptions, stereotypes, and the politics of relationships.
	
In addition to gender roles and stereotypes, the film also satirizes the movie industry. This is reflected not only through Jamie's adventures, but also through Howard, the cat actor who Jamie has projected her competitive drive onto. Howard's owner, Lola, takes the cat's career very seriously, complete with professional head shots and a demo reel.

Representation of butch women onscreen
While it's common to see comedies where men pose as women, female to male comedies are much less prominent. While the film is said to be a lesbian version of Tootsie, the fact that it highlights a butch actress marks it as unique. Jamie's stereotypical butch masculinity, sarcasm, and cockiness are rarely seen in such prominence in female actors on-screen. Unlike Dustin Hoffman in Tootsie, Jamie's career problems are not the result of a character flaw, but from a flaw in the way women are chosen to be represented.

Sequel
Writer/director/actor Michelle Ehlen is developing a sequel called Heterosexual Jill. While Butch Jamie is a satire on gender, Ehlen proposes to have the sequel be a satire on sexuality.

Awards

2007: Grand Jury Award for "Outstanding Actress in a Feature Film" to Michelle Ehlen at LA Outfest
2007: Jury Award for "Best Female Feature" at Long Island Gay and Lesbian Film Festival
2007: Jury Award for "Best Dramatic Feature" at Chicago Gay and Lesbian International Film Festival
2008: Special mention at Barcelona International Gay & Lesbian Film Festival

References

External links
 Butch Jamie Official Site
 Butch Jamie on the Internet Movie Database
 Production Company
 Blog Site

2007 romantic comedy films
2007 films
American LGBT-related films
Butch and femme
Films about filmmaking
American independent films
Lesbian-related films
2007 LGBT-related films
2000s English-language films
2000s American films